William George Alexander McKenzie  (3 December 1883 – 4 February 1969) was an Australian politician.

He was born in Woodend to hotel-keeper Henry Daniel McKenzie and Elizabeth Perry. He was educated at Wesley College. Melbourne.  On 23 June 1914 he married Mary Germaine, in Woodend, with whom he had three children. After the birth of his first child Joyce in Kyneton, he moved with his family to Wonthaggi, Victoria, where he worked for a time as a clerk at the State owned coal mine. From around 1922 he kept a general store at Wonthaggi, and also invested in gold. He served on the Borough of Wonthaggi 
 Council from 1924 to 1952, and was also founding president of the Woodend branch of the Labor Party. In 1927 he was elected to the Victorian Legislative Assembly for Wonthaggi. He was briefly Minister of Agriculture and Mines in 1943, and resumed the portfolio from 1945 to 1947. McKenzie was defeated in 1947, and was subsequently a member of the Council of Adult Education; he was also appointed an Officer of the Order of the British Empire. He died at Oakleigh in 1969.

References

1883 births
1969 deaths
Australian Labor Party members of the Parliament of Victoria
Members of the Victorian Legislative Assembly
Australian Officers of the Order of the British Empire
20th-century Australian politicians
Victorian Ministers for Agriculture